Kongolo may refer to:
 Kongolo Mwamba, the first king of the Luba Empire
 Kongolo, Tanganyika District, a town on the Lualaba River
 Roman Catholic Diocese of Kongolo, a diocese based on the town of Kongolo
 Rodney Kongolo (born 1998), Dutch professional footballer